Minetta Tavern, named after the Minetta Brook is a restaurant owned by Keith McNally in Greenwich Village. In 2009, Frank Bruni of The New York Times gave the Tavern three stars.  It served as a hangout for writers like e.e. cummings, Ernest Hemingway, Eugene O'Neill and Dylan Thomas.

McNally reopened the Tavern in 2009 as a “high-end revamp of a storied, nearly 100-year-old (space).”

History
The Minetta Tavern originally opened in 1937.

It was also a speakeasy hosted the aforementioned writers but also Joe Gould. It has been said he even received his mail at the pub.

McNally took over the restaurant in 2008 when it was owned by former busboy Taka Becovic and swerved family style Italian food. The first owner was Eddie “Minetta” Sieveri. After Sieveri sold the Tavern to  Becovic, he would return every year for his birthday dinner until his death. Becovic sold the restaurant insisted on raising the rent to a rate Becovic could not afford. Sieveri's son offered to buy it, but even he had to back off. Becovic didn't disclose what the landlord wanted in rent but it was speculated to be a minimum of $50,000/month. The plan was for the restaurant to close in early May 2008 and for McNally to reopen in October and change the menu to French Bistro.

References

Greenwich Village
Restaurants in Manhattan
Speakeasies
Steakhouses in New York City